Charadranaetes is a genus of flowering plants belonging to the family Asteraceae. It contains a single species, Charadranaetes durandii.

Its native range is Central America.

References

Senecioneae
Monotypic Asteraceae genera